South Moreton is a village and civil parish in South Oxfordshire, England, about  east of Didcot,  west of Wallingford, and  south of Abingdon. It is only separated by the Great Western Railway cutting from its twin village of North Moreton, a quarter of a mile to the north. Mortune took its name in the Domesday Book from the houses on the ridge above the moor of Hakka's Brook (now known as the Hagbourne or Hadden Marsh), and was part of Berkshire until the 1974 boundary changes. The 2011 Census recorded the parish population as 420.

Manors
The Domesday book of 1086 refers to Moretune. Its meaning is not entirely clear but four of the five manor houses are identifiable. Saunderville is still called The Manor. It is a moated manor house with horses grazing in the railed paddocks, seen to advantage from the railway. Huse or Bray is a recently renovated low building nearby, with a paddock in front, at the T-junction at the east end of the village. The only trace of Adresham is the terrace on which it once stood, opposite the village school. There is a 1950s house on the site.

At the time of the South Moreton Inclosure Act, 1818 c.18, the main landlord was Henry Hucks Gibbs, 1st Baron Aldenham and many of the inclosures were allotted to him. Hedges amassed a fortune and much local land, including the inclosures at Hall Farm and Fulscot Manor, both of which are still owned and farmed by his descendants.

Churches
The Church of England parish church of Saint John the Baptist at Bethesda, with its possibly Saxon doorway, stands by ancient earthworks at the southwestern edge of the village, by a ford on the former pilgrim route from the Downs to Dorchester. The church holds services only on major feast days and a few other occasions. Weddings, funerals and baptisms are also held by arrangement. The parish is part of the Churn Benefice, along with the neighbouring parishes of North Moreton, Aston Tirrold, Aston Upthorpe, Blewbury, Hagbourne, and Upton. South Moreton has a Strict Baptist chapel which has three services a week.

Character and amenities
There are a few large old houses on the High Street, some newer cottages at the east of the village, modern social housing to the West, and some 17th-century cottages between, many thatched. The largest house in South Moreton is The Hall, very close to the Huse. It is the last working farm in the village. Much Victorian history of the village is recorded in The Rector's Book, handwritten around 1905 from memories extending to 1845. It is now deposited in the Berkshire County Archives at Reading.

Amenities
South Moreton has a pub, a school, a church and a chapel, but no longer a shop or village hall, and both the Moretons Cricket Club ("MCC"!) and the North & South Moreton Women's Institute are now based in North Moreton.

School
South Moreton School, 200 yards east of Gothic Lodge on the High Street, is a County Primary School. with an attached pre-School.

Transport
Thames Travel route 94 provides a limited service to South Moreton from Mondays to Fridays, linking the village with Didcot and with Didcot Parkway railway station. Buses run only during school terms, and there is no Saturday or Sunday service. Didcot Parkway, three miles to the West, is a major rail junction to the West, North, and East, and has frequent 40 minute train services to and from London Paddington, however, even though there are no fast trains  is nearly as close and nearer to London.

The Crown community pub
The Crown Inn, 200 yards from the School, is the community centre, although it is conspicuously at the Eastern end of the village, above the village notice-board and pub sign on a bit of common land opposite The Hall. The Crown is the triumphant survivor of the many public houses in the village when the Great Western Railway was built in the 1840s; amongst the South Moreton rivals to the Crown was the Anchor, 300 yards to the south, and there were also at least another eight such public houses in North Moreton and the Astons. The Moreton Magistrates complained of the disorderly public houses, because of the strapping, streetwise "navigators" with money in their pockets from building the line. These navvies lodged in the villages by the railheads, and attracted the local lasses; needless to say, their swains objected rather more violently than the rector. Next time you pass along the Great Western Railway lines, remember the men who disappeared in the nightly violence and are said to rest beneath you.

In the 1990s The Crown was the last tied pub rebuilt by Wadworths of Devizes, before breweries were stopped by statute from owning more public houses. Mr Bartholomew as chairman, and his son Mr Bartholomew as Managing Director, personally reopened it as a really nice traditional village pub, with a successful landlord, real ale, real barmaids, and real dogs snoring at the real fire. After the Millennium, with the growth of motor traffic, supermarket off-sales, videos, and the breathalyser, with dismal food and without new ideas, The Crown sadly declined until it went dark again from 2011 to September 2012. Wadworths, now less benign, found new managers but started charging their tied pub at more than supermarket prices, perhaps deliberately in order to close it in July 2016. They sold the Crown to a developer, who calmly applied for planning permission to demolish the pub and build over the common land that does not belong to it. 

A neighbouring patron roused the village to form the South Moreton Community Benefit Society, which successfully raised funds, had the District Council designate the Crown as an Asset of Community Value and reject the planning application, bought the pub, and in May 2019 reopened it as a Community Pub. Once again with enthusiastic lady managers, it is a traditional village pub, with real ale, real barmaids, and real dogs snoring at the real open fire or begging for the really decent pub food. There are comfy sofas, and  space for social isolation if you prefer it, and the gardens when Spring comes. Since late 2020, in tiers 3 and 4 of COVID-19, The Crown has become a good takeaway. With competing village pubs a mile away to both North (The Bear at North Moreton) and South (The Chequers/ Sweet Olive/ Fat Frog gastropub at Aston Tirrold, due to be reopened by its former French chef), it remains to be seen at Easter 2021 how they can each find profitable trades.

References

Bibliography

External links

 South Moreton Village website

Civil parishes in Oxfordshire
Villages in Oxfordshire